The 2017–18 Guam Soccer League (Budweiser Soccer League for sponsorship reasons) was the 29th season of Guam Soccer League, Guam's First tier professional football league. Rovers are the defending champions. The season started on 15 September 2017.

Regular season

Play-off stage
The top eight teams of the regular season qualify for the play-off stage.

See also
2018 Guam FA Cup

References

External links
Guam Football Association
Soccerway

Guam Soccer League seasons
Guam
2017 in Guam
2018 in Guam